Fagner Conserva Lemos (born 11 June 1989), simply known as Fagner, is a Brazilian professional footballer who plays as a right-back for Campeonato Brasileiro Série A club Corinthians.

Club career
Fagner made his debut aged just 17 and helped Corinthians by trouncing  Fortaleza 4–0 in an away match for the 2006 Campeonato Brasileiro Série A.

In 2007, he moved to PSV.

In 2009, he went to Vasco da Gama. In Vasco he was the champion of Série B in 2009. In 2011, he won the Copa do Brasil.

On 24 July 2012, he joined VfL Wolfsburg on a four-year contract. After one season in the Bundesliga he returned to former club Vasco da Gama on loan until the end of 2013.

in 2014, after 7 years, Fagner returned to Corinthians on loan from Wolfsburg. At the beginning of 2015, Corinthians acquired half of his economical rights and signed him exclusively.

International career

Fagner was a member of the Brazilian under-20 team on 2007 South American U-20 Championship, which Brazil went on to win.

Fagner was named in Brazil's provisional squad for Copa América Centenario but was cut from the final squad.

On 22 August 2016, Fagner was called up by new Brazilian team coach Tite to 2018 World Cup qualification games against Ecuador and Colombia. According to Fagner, this is a "unique moment" in his career.

On 14 May 2018, Fagner was included by Tite in the 23-man Brazil squad for the 2018 FIFA World Cup in Russia. Initially a back-up to Dani Alves, and then to Danilo who replaced the injured Alves, Fagner made his debut in the competition in the second group stage game, against Costa Rica, which Brazil won 2-0, starting the game due to Danilo's injury. He then proceeded to play the next three games, as Danilo's injuries persisted, with Brazil eventually falling to Belgium in the quarter-finals.

In May 2019, he was called for the Copa América, which Brazil was due to host. With Dani Alves playing the entire tournament as captain and starting right-back, Fagner was the only outfield player from the squad to not enter a match during the competition, and the third overall alongside reserve keepers Ederson and Cássio, as Brazil eventually conquered their 9th continental title.

Career statistics

Club

International

Honours
EC Vitória
Campeonato Baiano: 2007

PSV
Eredivisie: 2008
Johan Cruyff Shield: 2008

Vasco da Gama
Campeonato Brasileiro Série B: 2009
Copa do Brasil: 2011

Corinthians
Campeonato Brasileiro Série A: 2015, 2017
Campeonato Paulista: 2017, 2018, 2019

Brazil
Copa América: 2019

Individual
Campeonato Brasileiro Série A Team of the Year: 2011, 2017, 2020
Campeonato Paulista Team of the Year: 2015, 2016, 2017
Bola de Prata: 2017

References

External links
Fagner at PSV.nl 

Association football defenders
Living people
1989 births
Brazilian footballers
Brazil international footballers
Campeonato Brasileiro Série A players
Campeonato Brasileiro Série B players
Bundesliga players
Sport Club Corinthians Paulista players
Esporte Clube Vitória players
PSV Eindhoven players
CR Vasco da Gama players
VfL Wolfsburg players
Brazilian expatriate footballers
Expatriate footballers in the Netherlands
Expatriate footballers in Germany
Brazilian expatriate sportspeople in the Netherlands
Brazilian expatriate sportspeople in Germany
Footballers from São Paulo
Brazil youth international footballers
2018 FIFA World Cup players
Eredivisie players
2019 Copa América players
Copa América-winning players